The Internazionali di Tennis San Marino Open (formerly known as the San Marino CEPU Open and San Marino GO&FUN Open) is a professional tennis tournament played on red clay. It is currently part of the Association of Tennis Professionals (ATP) Challenger Tour and has been held annually in San Marino since 1988 (as a Challenger in 1988, as a Grand Prix Regular Series tournament in 1989, as an ATP World Series tournament from 1990 to 1999, as an ATP International Series tournament in 2000, and as a Challenger again from 2001 until 2014, returned in 2021). For the first three years it was held at Centro Sportivo Serravalle before moving to its current home in 1991, the Centro Tennis Cassa di Risparmio di Fonte dell'Ovo in the City of San Marino.

Past finals

Key

Singles

Doubles

See also
 WTA San Marino – women's tournament (1991–1993)

References